Rancho Bernardo is a master-planned community  in the northern hills of the city of San Diego, California.

Geography
The topography of Rancho Bernardo consists of canyons and rolling hills that have large bedrock outcroppings. The major floral biomes of Rancho Bernardo are chaparral, coastal sage scrub, Southern California grassland and freshwater marsh/riparian habitat.

Climate
Rancho Bernardo has a Mediterranean climate (Köppen Csa). Rancho Bernardo has warm, dry summers and mild winters. Rainfall is relatively sparse, and most rain falls between December and March.

History

Pre-Colonial
The pre-colonial history of this area is divided into an early (prior to circa 900 BCE) and a late period. The period of habitation is from around 850 CE to 1790 CE.  The peoples believed to have occupied this site are the Kumeyaay (formerly known as Diegueno/Ipai), although there are strong traces of Luiseño as well. During the late period, the Westwood Valley complex was a village located along an intermittent stream bed. This village was likely known to the Kumeyaay as Sinyau-Pichkara. The area the village occupied is now under the western section of Ranch Bernardo near Duenda and Poblado Roads.

Post-Colonial
Rancho Bernardo is located on the Rancho San Bernardo Mexican land grant made between 1842 and 1845.

In the 1960s, Rancho Bernardo was annexed by San Diego. The area was developed by AVCO Community Developers until their involvement ceased in 1984.

On October 22, 2007, the Witch Creek Fire burned through Rancho Bernardo and several other populous areas of San Diego County, destroying hundreds of homes, and completely destroying several entire neighborhoods, particularly ones that firefighters had trouble accessing due to rugged terrain and rapidly advancing flames pushed by strong Santa Ana winds. The highly unpredictable flames pushed into the northeast section of Poway during the day, prompting evacuation of Palomar-Pomerado Hospital. The neighborhoods of the Trails, Montelena and Westwood were the main areas hit in Rancho Bernardo.

Economy
The Carmel Mountain Ranch/Rancho Bernardo submarket is the fifth largest office space submarket in San Diego County, with over 6 million square feet of office space. It is part of an "I-15 edge city", edge city being a major center of employment outside a traditional downtown.

Tourism
There is an annual carnival-type street fair, RB Alive!, during the summer. Rancho Bernardo is also home to the oldest-operating winery in the region, the Bernardo Winery, established in 1889 and family-owned and operated since 1927.

Industry

Rancho Bernardo is home to the corporate headquarters of Sony Electronics, Inc. and a major office of Sony Interactive Entertainment, LLC. Other companies with a presence in the area include General Atomics, Broadcom, Hewlett-Packard, Microsoft, Renovate America, Teradata, LSI Corporation, BAE Systems, ASML, Northrop Grumman and Amazon. Located in a  business park, there are approximately 50,000 workers employed by these companies.

Education
The area is part of the Poway Unified School District.

Schools
Primary 
 Creekside Elementary School
 Highland Ranch Elementary School
 Shoal Creek Elementary School
 Turtleback Elementary School
 Westwood Elementary School
 Chaparral Elementary School
 Painted Rock Elementary School
Secondary
Bernardo Heights Middle School
Rancho Bernardo High School

Notable people
 Bob Miller (baseball, born 1939), former baseball pitcher Los Angeles Dodgers, St Louis Cardinals, New York Mets

References

External links 

San Diego North Chamber of Commerce (formerly Rancho Bernardo Chamber of Commerce)
Rancho Bernardo Historical Society Web site
Scouts BSA Troop 667 (boys only)
Scouts BSA Troop 1667 (girls only)

Neighborhoods in San Diego
North County (San Diego County)
Planned communities in California
Edge cities in the San Diego metropolitan area